Bradwell Institute is a public high school located in Hinesville, Georgia, United States.  It serves the western half of Hinesville, western Fort Stewart, Walthourville, Allenhurst, and Gumbranch. It is a part of the Liberty County School District.

Its principal is Mr. Roland Van Horn.

Bradwell serves grades 9–12 with about 1,600 students currently enrolled.

School activities include football, basketball, baseball, softball, cheerleading, soccer, volleyball, golf, tennis, cross country, track & field, and rifle team JROTC.

History

According to the school's website:
"Bradwell Institute was founded in 1871 by Captain Samuel Dowse Bradwell, C.S.A, and others, succeeding the Hinesville Institute, which had closed during the American Civil War.  The school was named for Colonel James Sharpe Bradwell, father of Captain Bradwell.  For many years, Bradwell Institute was a private school where students paid tuition and boarded in private homes. Thereafter it became a 12-year public school. Today, Bradwell Institute is a public comprehensive high school with a curriculum that is geared to the interests and needs of students of different ability levels and educational backgrounds.  Bradwell also offers a variety of student activities to match the varied interests of the student body. The school is continually upgrading facilities and equipment in order to keep up with the changes occurring in education and business today."

Official GHSA State Titles

Baseball (1) - 1976(2A) 
Football (1) - 1965(B)

Notable alumni
Gary Guyton, former NFL player
Ulrick John, former NFL player
DeLisha Milton-Jones, former WNBA player
Will Pettis, Arena Football Hall of Fame player
Kevin Harris, Current RB for the *New England Patriots

External links

 Bradwell Institute

References 

Public high schools in Georgia (U.S. state)
Schools in Liberty County, Georgia
1871 establishments in Georgia (U.S. state)
Educational institutions established in 1871